The siege of Brest in 1386 was a siege by forces led by John IV, Duke of Brittany, against English-occupied Brest during the Hundred Years’ War. The siege was relieved by an English army commanded by John of Gaunt, Duke of Lancaster.

Citations

References

1380s in France
1386 in England
Conflicts in 1386
History of Brest, France
Military history of Brittany
War of the Breton Succession
Hundred Years' War, 1369–1389
Sieges of the Hundred Years' War